Sheldon Holder (born 30 September 1991) is a Guyanese footballer who plays for the Morvant Caledonia United of Trinidad & Tobago, and the Guyanese national team. He scored his first hat-trick, internationally during the CONCACAF Nations League qualifying rounds where he scored three goals in the 0-8 match against the Turks and Caicos Islands.

International career

Guyana
An international for Guyana since 2011, he was named to the final 23-man squad for the 2019 CONCACAF Gold Cup on May 31, 2019.

International goals
Scores and results list Guyana's goal tally first.

References

External links

1991 births
Living people
Guyana international footballers
Association football forwards
Sportspeople from Georgetown, Guyana
Guyanese footballers
Guyanese expatriate footballers
Expatriate footballers in Trinidad and Tobago
Afro-Guyanese people
2019 CONCACAF Gold Cup players